Filomena Rotiroti (born May 17, 1974) is a Canadian politician. Rotiroti was elected to represent the riding of Jeanne-Mance–Viger in the National Assembly of Quebec in the 2008 provincial election. She is a member of the Quebec Liberal Party. Prior to her election to office, she worked as a chief of staff to her caucus colleague Lise Thériault. She also worked as counsellor for the Minister of Economic and Regional Development.

Electoral Record 

|}

|}

|}

^ Change is from redistributed results. CAQ change is from ADQ. 

|-
 
|Liberal
|Filomena Rotiroti
|align="right"|16433
|align="right"|73.05
|align="right"|

|-

|Independent
|Katia Proulx
|align="right"|281
|align="right"|1.25
|align="right"|
|-

|-
|||||Total valid votes
|align="right"|22,497
|align="right"|98.57
|-
|||||Total rejected ballots
|align="right"|326
|align="right"|1.43
|-
|||||Turnout
|align="right"|22,823
|align="right"|46.95
|-
|||||Electors on the lists
|align="right"|48,609

References

External links
 Liberal Party biography 
 

1974 births
Canadian people of Italian descent
People from Saint-Leonard, Quebec
Living people
Politicians from Montreal
Quebec Liberal Party MNAs
Women MNAs in Quebec
21st-century Canadian politicians
21st-century Canadian women politicians